The Occupational Medicine Specialists of Canada (OMSOC) is a non-profit organization representing occupational medicine specialists, established in 2006 and based in Ottawa, Ontario, Canada.  Its first annual general meeting was in 2007 in Vancouver, British Columbia. It is the National Specialty Society for occupational medicine specialists in Canada. The founding president is Dr. Michael Schweigert (2006–2010).

The mission of OMSOC is to promote and enhance the medical specialty practice of occupational medicine in Canada, a specialty recognized by the Royal College of Physicians and Surgeons of Canada, and to act as the Canadian voice for that specialty.  OMSOC also accredits continuing medical education for occupational medicine specialty events.

OMSOC supports national health policy having been a contributor to the Canadian Choosing Wisely effort.

Officers

Executive
Dr. Ken Corbet - President (2015 - )
Dr. Aaron Thompson - Secretary (2010 - )

Directors

Dr. Steve Tsekrekos
Dr. Neils Koehncke
Dr. Tom Lawley
Dr. Ron Dykeman
Dr. Ihor Taraschuk

Past Presidents
 Dr. Ken Corbet (current)
 Dr. Joan Saary (2012-2015)
 Dr. Bruce McGoveran (2010-2012)
 Dr. Michael Schweigert (2006–2010)

Annual General Meetings
Annual general meetings are held in various locations (usually) across Canada to promote the education of occupational medicine specialists.  Meeting locations:
 2015 - Toronto, Ontario
 2014 - Edmonton, Alberta
 2013 - Toronto, Ontario
 2012 - Boston, Massachusetts 
 2011 - Niagara-on-the-Lake, Ontario
 2010 - Saskatoon, Saskatchewan
 2009 - Ottawa, Ontario
 2008 - Quebec City, Quebec
 2007 - Vancouver, British Columbia

External links
Occupational Medicine Specialists of Canada  Canada

Medical associations based in Canada
Occupational health practitioners